Akira Chen (born 10 March 1969) is a Taiwanese actor and film director.

Career
Chen was commissioned by Shei-pa National Park to direct a film about the Atayal people and culture. The work became Msgamil: Once Upon a Time, also known as A Thousand Years of Atayal, and premiered in 2008. Chen first feature film, Everlasting Moments, was released in 2011, and portrayed the Amis and the Atayal.

Chen was first credited as an actor in Leon Dai's 2009 film Cannot Live Without You. Chen's leading role as Li Wu-hsiung won him the Taipei Film Award for best actor. Chen has also appeared on stage, in The Waste Land (2010), and Taipei Singer (2011).

Chen contested the 2016 legislative elections as a member of the Democratic Progressive Party from Changhua County's first district, losing to Kuomintang incumbent Wang Huei-mei. Chen was subsequently appointed to lead the Changhua County Cultural Affairs Bureau.

References

External links

1969 births
Living people
Politicians of the Republic of China on Taiwan from Changhua County
Taiwanese male stage actors
Taiwanese male film actors
21st-century Taiwanese male actors
Democratic Progressive Party (Taiwan) politicians
Taiwanese actor-politicians
Taiwanese film directors